USS Pontotoc (AK-206/AG-94/AVS-7) was an  acquired by the US Navy shortly before the end of  World War II.

Construction
Pontotoc was laid down for the US Maritime Commission (MARCOM), MC hull 2160, by Leathem D. Smith Shipbuilding Company, Sturgeon Bay, Wisconsin, 15 January 1944; classified AK-206 on 25 February 1944; launched 2 July 1944; acquired from MARCOM on a loan-charter basis 28 February 1945; reclassified AG–94 on 12 March 1945; and commissioned 22 March 1945.

World War II-related service
After shakedown, Pontotoc transited the Panama Canal and arrived Pearl Harbor 18 April 1945. Reclassified as Gwinnett-class aviation stores issue ship AVS-7 effective 25 May, Pontotoc steamed for the Philippine Islands, reporting for duty 8 July at Guiuan, Samar, Philippine Islands. She provided aviation stores on station in the Philippines through the end of hostilities.

Post-war inactivation
Pontotoc then proceeded to the 12th Naval District. She decommissioned and was delivered to the War Shipping Administration (WSA) 26 April 1946, at San Francisco, California. She was struck from the Navy List 8 May 1946.

Merchant service
She was sold 14 August 1947, to the French firm  Messageries Maritimes, and renamed Taurus. In 1960 she was sold to Morocco and renamed Tadjera.

Notes 

Citations

Bibliography 

Online resources

External links

 

Alamosa-class cargo ships
Ships built in Sturgeon Bay, Wisconsin
1944 ships
World War II auxiliary ships of the United States
Pontotoc County, Mississippi
Pontotoc County, Oklahoma
Gwinnett-class aviation stores issue ships